James Busby (7 February 1802 – 15 July 1871) was the British Resident in New Zealand from 1833 to 1840. He was involved in drafting the 1835 Declaration of the Independence of New Zealand and the 1840 Treaty of Waitangi. As British Resident, he acted as New Zealand's first jurist and the "originator of law in Aotearoa", to whom New Zealand "owes almost all of its underlying jurisprudence". Busby is regarded as the "father" of the Australian wine industry, as he brought the first collection of vine stock from Spain and France to Australia.

Life
He was born in Edinburgh, Scotland, the son of English engineer John Busby and mother Sarah Kennedy. His parents and he emigrated from Britain to Port Jackson, New South Wales, in 1824.

Busby received a Grant of Land from the Governor of New South Wales and after much careful deliberation chose a block of 2,000 acres in the Coal River area of the Hunter Region, where he began growing grapes. At the same time, he took employment at the Male Orphans School at Bald Hills near Liverpool where he was in charge of the farm and taught viticulture. When the trustees of the Church and School Corporation took over control of the school in 1827, Busby lost the job. He was then appointed collector of internal revenue temporarily, until 1829. The government made him a new job offer but he was not happy with it nor with the terms of his severance from the orphan school, and returned to England in 1831 to petition the Colonial Office. He also visited Spain and France to further his study in viticulture. He wrote a number of reports that he presented to the Colonial Office and one on the state of New Zealand earned him appointment as British Resident in New Zealand in March 1832. Busby returned to Sydney on 16 October 1832.

In New Zealand
Busby married Agnes Dow at Segenhoe, in the Hunter Region, on 1 November 1832. He left for New Zealand on H.M.S. Imogene in April 1833 and arrived in the Bay of Islands on 5 May. Agnes followed him, arriving in July. A house (which still stands) was completed for him at Waitangi, where he planted some of the vine stock he had collected in Europe, from which vineyard wine was being made before his vines were productive in Australia. His duties were to protect British commerce, control, and to mediate between the unruly Pākehā settlers and Māori in New Zealand.  However, he was not provided with any resources to impose this authority.

After an unregistered New Zealand ship was seized in Australia, Busby proposed that New Zealand should have a national flag.  A selection of three or four designs was sent from Australia, and Māori chiefs chose one at a meeting at his residency on 20 March 1834; see United Tribes of New Zealand.

Independence and Treaty of Waitangi
In 1835 Busby learned that Baron Charles de Thierry, a Frenchman, was proposing to declare French sovereignty over New Zealand. He drafted the Declaration of the Independence of New Zealand and at a meeting in October signed it together with 35 chiefs from the northern part of New Zealand.

After the arrival of William Hobson in 1840, Busby co-authored with him the Treaty of Waitangi.  It was first signed on 5 and 6 February 1840 on the lawn outside his residence. Busby and his family left Waitangi that year. He declined an offer for a position in the new colonial government, and instead focused on farming interests, but became entangled in litigation over his own land titles: the New Zealand Banking Company seized his Waitangi property without giving Busby's debtors an opportunity to pay what they owed, and Governor Grey expropriated Busby's land at Whangārei. He also edited a newspaper and in 1853 was elected a member of the Auckland Provincial Council. As a member of the provincial council, he became an outspoken supporter of establishing Auckland as a separate colony to the rest of New Zealand. Popular opinion at the time went against Busby, and some newspapers claimed his arguments for Auckland's separation were due to his inability to settle land claims with the colonial government.

He contested the 1860 general election for a seat in the House of Representatives for the Bay of Islands electorate, but was unsuccessful.

Later life
He died in 1871 in Anerley, England, after travelling back for an eye operation, and is buried at West Norwood Cemetery in London. His wife returned to New Zealand where she died, at Pakaraka, in 1889, and is buried at Paihia. James and Agnes had six children. Daughter Sarah married John William Williams, son of missionary Henry Williams.

The Waitangi property, on which the Treaty was signed, was derelict until the 1930s, when it was purchased by the Governor-General of the day, Viscount Bledisloe and donated to the nation.

Published writings 
 Treatise on the Culture of the Vine (1825)
 A Manual of Plain Directions for Planting and Cultivating Vineyards and for Making Wine in New South Wales (Sydney 1830)
 Journal of a Tour through some of the vineyards of Spain and France (Sydney 1833)

See also
 Australian wine
 New Zealand wine
 List of wine personalities

References

Sources

External links 

 James Busby, Melbourne University
 Waitangi Treaty Grounds
 Newsletter 48, Friends of West Norwood Cemetery
 Colonial Secretary's papers 1822-1877, State Library of Queensland- includes digitised letters written by Busby to the Colonial Secretary of New South Wales when he was employed as Collector of Internal Revenue 

1801 births
1871 deaths
19th-century Australian businesspeople
19th-century New Zealand businesspeople
19th-century Scottish businesspeople
Australian people of English descent
Australian people of Scottish descent
People from the Bay of Islands
Wine merchants
Treaty of Waitangi
Burials at West Norwood Cemetery
New Zealand people of Scottish descent
New Zealand people of English descent